Tanat Wongsuparak (born 19 February 1985) is a professional footballer from Thailand.

He played for Krung Thai Bank FC (later Bangkok Glass) in the 2008 AFC Champions League group stage.

References

1985 births
Living people
Tanat Wongsuparak
Tanat Wongsuparak
Association football midfielders
Tanat Wongsuparak
Tanat Wongsuparak
Tanat Wongsuparak
Tanat Wongsuparak
Tanat Wongsuparak
Tanat Wongsuparak
Tanat Wongsuparak
Tanat Wongsuparak
Tanat Wongsuparak